Antromycopsis is a genus of fungi in the Pleurotaceae family. The genus, an anamorphic form of Pleurotus, has a widespread distribution and contains three species.

References

External links

Pleurotaceae
Agaricales genera
Taxa named by Narcisse Théophile Patouillard